Federal Highway 87 (Fed. 87, Carretera Tula–Jorobas) is a highway in Mexico. The highways starts in the north in Tula de Allende, Hidalgo (state) at the Libramiento de Tula. The highway runs easterly approximately  then it turns south to end in Jorobas, Huehuetoca, State of Mexico, at Fed. 57D (Autopista Mexico-Queretaro, ''Carretera Coyotepec–Tepeji del Rio Ocampo) toll road.

References

087